Vachellia robusta, the splendid thorn, is an Afrotropical tree species.

It is native to eastern and southern Africa, ranging from Ethiopia and Somalia in the north to South Africa and Namibia in southern Africa.

Subspecies
Three subspecies are accepted:
 Vachellia robusta subsp. clavigera (E.Mey.) Kyal. & Boatwr. – native to Malawi, Mozambique, Zambia, Zimbabwe, Botswana, Namibia, Eswatini, and South Africa.
 Vachellia robusta subsp. robusta – native to South Africa, Botswana, and western Zimbabwe.
 Vachellia robusta subsp. usambarensis (Taub.) Kyal. & Boatwr. – native to Ethiopia, Somalia, Kenya, Tanzania, and Mozambique. It is a common canopy tree in drier undifferentiated forest communities in the Northern and Southern Zanzibar-Inhambane coastal forest mosaic of coastal Somalia, Kenya, Tanzania, and Mozambique, where it grows up to 20 meters high.

Gallery

References

robusta
Trees of Southern Africa
Flora of East Africa